Rhino Poetry is a nonprofit literary journal based in Evanston, Illinois. 

Established in 1976 as an outlet for members of the Poetry Forum workshops, Rhino expanded its scope in 2002 to national and international poets. It features works from unknown and established English-language poets, as well as short'shorts or flash fiction and poetry in translation. One of the oldest independent literary journals in the American Midwest, Rhino Poetry holds monthly poetry readings in Evanston, which have been active since 2002. The Illinois Arts Council awarded RHINO poets with literary prizes in 2002, 2003, and 2008. 

Literary Magazine Review called Rhino  “an annual that anyone interested in American poetry should attend to”. It has received funding from the Evanston Arts Council and the Town of Normal Harmon Arts Grant.

Yusef Komunyakaa selected a Rhino 2002 poem, “Skin” by poet Susan Dickman, Rhino 2002 for publication in The Best American Poetry 2003. In 2006, Billy Collins selected Daniel Gutstein's "Monsieur Pierre Est Mort" from Rhino 2005  for The Best American Poetry 2006.

References

External links 
 RHINO Poetry
 Chicago Poetry

Poetry magazines published in the United States
Magazines established in 1976
Magazines published in Illinois